Frank Sanders may refer to:

Frank P. Sanders (1919–1997), U.S. Under Secretary of the Navy
Frank Sanders (American football) (born 1973), former American football player
Frank Sanders (ice hockey) (1949–2012), American ice hockey player
Frank Knight Sanders, American missionary, theologian, scholar and congregational minister